Charles Hayward (6 June 1867 – 2 February 1934) was an Australian cricketer. He played in three first-class matches for South Australia in 1891/92.

See also
 List of South Australian representative cricketers

References

External links
 

1867 births
1934 deaths
Australian cricketers
South Australia cricketers
Cricketers from Adelaide